ETO Park is a multi-use stadium in Győr, Hungary. It is primarily used for football and is home to Győri ETO. Opened in 2008 as a replacement for Stadion ETO, the stadium has a capacity of 15,600.

The stadium complex also includes three grass practice pitches and one synthetic practice pitch, as well as two indoor pitches.

History

On 26 February 2011, it was announced that the sectors of the stadium will be named after 40 legendary former Győr players.

On 17 October 2012, the ETO Park Hotel was opened. At the opening ceremony Zsolt Borkai, mayor of Győr and Péter Szijjártó, Hungarian MP were present.

On 8 July 2013, it was announced that on 11 August 2013 Győr will host Bayern Munich in order to celebrate the 20th anniversary of the Audi Hungaria Motor Kft.

Milestone matches

International matches

Attendances
As of 11 April 2017.

Gallery

References

External links

Stadium website 

Győri ETO FC
Football venues in Hungary
Buildings and structures in Győr-Moson-Sopron County